Eric Sinclair (born William Allison Walker; April 26, 1922 – January 26, 2004) was an American film and television actor. He is best known for appearing in War of the Satellites (1959), Ma Barker's Killer Brood (1960), Butch Cassidy and the Sundance Kid (1969). Sinclair died in January 2004 in Los Angeles, California at the age of 81.

Filmography

Film

Television

References

External links 

Rotten Tomatoes profile

1922 births
2004 deaths
Male actors from Oklahoma
American male film actors
American male television actors
20th-century American male actors